Frank Hastings is a fictional detective in the Homicide Detail of the San Francisco Police Department, who is the main character in a police procedural series by Collin Wilcox (1924-1996).

Hastings is a divorced man who came to the law enforcement profession comparatively late in life.  Like his creator, he was born and raised in Detroit, Michigan.  After graduating from college, he was briefly a professional football player in the Detroit Lions.  After his marriage went sour, he moved west and eventually joined the SFPD.  He rose quickly in the department and is now the junior lieutenant in Homicide, subordinate to his close friend, Lieutenant Pete Friedman.

Most of the Hastings novels are first-person narratives told by Hastings himself, but some later books in the series are told in the third person.

One of the entries in the series, Twospot, was a collaboration between Wilcox and Bill Pronzini.  It teamed Hastings with Pronzini's popular series character, a middle-aged San Francisco private investigator referred to by fans as the Nameless Detective.  Hastings and "Nameless" alternate as narrators of the novel.

The Hastings series was widely praised in publications like The Armchair Detective for their convincing characters, strong plots, and vivid portrayal of San Francisco.

The Frank Hastings titles include:

 The Lonely Hunter (1969)
 The Disappearance (1970)
 Dead Aim (1971)
 Hiding Place (1973)
 Long Way Down (1974)
 Aftershock (1975)
 Doctor, Lawyer (1977)
 Twospot (1978) with Bill Pronzini
 The Watcher (1978)
 Power Plays (1979)
 Mankiller (1980)
 Stalking Horse (1982)
 Victims (1984)
 Night Games (1986)
 The Pariah (1988)
 Death Before Dying (1990)
 Hire a Hangman (1991)
 Dead Center (1992)
 Switchback (1993)
 Calculated Risk (1995)

References

Hastings, Frank